"You" is a 1995 single by British house music studio project Staxx, assembled by producers Simon Thorne and Tom Jones, and featuring British singer Carol Leeming. This was their second number one on the US Billboard Hot Dance Club Play chart (after 1994's "Joy"), reaching the top spot on July 1, 1995. The single peaked at number 50 on the UK Singles Chart.

Critical reception
Larry Flick from Billboard wrote that the dance act "that brought "Joy" to many a punter over a year ago is back with a peppy Euro-disco mover that soars above the current throng of NRGetic wannabes on the strength of Carol Leeming's forceful vocal. She injects sass and bounce to a simple pop hook, while also anchoring the track's frothy mélange of sugary synths and loops." Andy Beevers from Music Weeks RM Dance Update said, "This belated follow-up to 'Joy' is another big and confident song backed by an impressive array of remixes that provides justification for the doublepack." He added, "The top of the Club Chart beckons." Another editor, James Hamilton described it as a "Carol Leeming hollered happy M People-ish devotional pure gospel galloper". Debby Peterson from The Network Forty deemed it a "great dance record".

Track listing
 CD-single (US)'
"You" (Man City Radio Edit) — 4:05
"You" (Overworld Radio Edit) — 4:04  
"You" (Man City Vocal) — 6:43 
"You" (Overworld Vocal) — 6:25 
"You" (Staxx Original Mix) — 6:25 
"You" (Sound Factory Mix) — 8:00 
"You" (Sound Factory Edit) — 3:47

Charts

External links
 Release information from Discogs

References

 

1995 singles
1995 songs
Champion Records singles
Columbia Records singles
Staxx songs